Vaikuntha, also called Vishnuloka, and Tirunatu (Tirunāṭu) in Tamil, is the abode of Vishnu, the supreme deity in the Vaishnava tradition of Hinduism, and his consort, Lakshmi, the supreme goddess.

According to Ramanuja, Vaikuntha is the Parama Padam or Nitya Vibhuti, an "eternal heavenly realm", and is the "divine imperishable world that is God's abode". In Vaishnava literature, Vaikuntha is described as the highest realm above the fourteen lokas (worlds), where the devotees of Vishnu go upon achieving liberation. It is guarded by the twin deities, Jaya and Vijaya, the gatekeepers of Vaikuntha. The army of Vishnu, stationed at Vaikuntha, is led by Vishvaksena. The planets of Vaikuntha are described to be full of golden palaces and hanging gardens that grow fragrant fruits and flowers.

The planets of Vaikuntha begin 26,200,000 yojanas (209,600,000 miles) above Satyaloka. In most of the extant Puranas and Vaishnava traditions, Vaikuntha is located in the direction of the Makara Rashi, which coincides with the constellation of the Capricorn. One version of the cosmology states that Vishnu's eye is present at the south celestial pole, from where he watches the cosmos.

Literature

Vedas 
The Vedas do not mention Vaikuntha, but a verse in the Rigveda mentions Vishnu's feet as a potential abode:

Bhagavata Purana 
Vaikuntha and its characteristics are described in the Bhagavata Purana, a revered text in Vaishnavism, which was composed between the eighth and the tenth century CE, and maybe as early as the 6th century CE. 

Edwin Bryant, in his book from 2003, comments about the verses describing Vaikuntha in the text of Bhagavata Purana:

Translation of some verses in Canto 2, by Bibek Debroy:

Narayana Upanishad 
The Narayana Upanishad mentions the abode:

Brihad Bhagavatamrita 
The Brihad Bhagavatamrita paints a picture of Vishnu's activities at Vaikuntha:

Tiruvaymoli 
In the work of Nammalvar, Vaikuntha is referred to as Tirunatu (sacred land) in the Tamil literary tradition. In Sri Vaishnava tradition, this abode is listed as the one hundred and eighth, and the last of the Divya Desams, the divine realms of Vishnu on earth and beyond. The verses of the Tiruvaymoli describe this abode as the following:

See also
Kailasa
Satyaloka
Kshira Sagara
Lakshmi Narayana
Goloka Vrindavana
Vaikuntha Chaturdashi

References

Bibliography
Dallapiccola, Anna. Dictionary of Hindu Lore and Legend. .
Gail, Adalbert J. 1983. "On the Symbolism of Three- and Four-Faced Vishnu Images: A Reconsideration of Evidence." Artibus Asiae 44(4):297–307. pp. 298–99.

Vaishnavism
Locations in Hindu mythology
Conceptions of heaven
Divya Desams